Rytkönen is a Finnish surname.

Geographical distribution
As of 2014, 94.7% of all known bearers of the surname Rytkönen were residents of Finland (frequency 1:1,848), 3.6% of Sweden (1:87,139) and 1.0% of Estonia (1:10,167).

In Finland, the frequency of the surname was higher than national average (1:1,848) in the following regions:
 1. Northern Savonia (1:375)
 2. Kainuu (1:896)
 3. Central Finland (1:1,387)
 4. North Karelia (1:1,395)
 5. Southern Savonia (1:1,644)
 6. Lapland (1:1,650)

People
 August Rytkönen (1886–1960), Finnish construction worker and politician
 Aulis Rytkönen (1929–2014), Finnish footballer
 Arvo Rytkönen (1929–1980), Finnish Minister of Trade and Industry
 Seppo Rytkönen, Finnish orienteering competitor

References

Finnish-language surnames
Surnames of Finnish origin